In number theory, the diamond operators 〈d〉 are operators acting on the space of modular forms for the group Γ1(N), given by the action of a matrix in  Γ0(N) where δ ≈ d mod N. The diamond operators form an abelian group and commute with the Hecke operators.

Unicode 
In Unicode, the diamond operator is represented by the character .

Notes

References 

Modular forms